The Australia women's national cricket team toured India in December 2004. They played against India in seven One Day Internationals, winning the series 4–3.

Squads

WODI Series

1st ODI

2nd ODI

3rd ODI

4th ODI

5th ODI

6th ODI

7th ODI

References

External links
Australia Women tour of India 2004/05 from Cricinfo

International cricket competitions in 2004
2004 in women's cricket
Women's international cricket tours of India
Australia women's national cricket team tours